

360001–360100 

|-id=072
| 360072 Alcimedon ||  || Alcimedon, son of Laerceus, and one of the commanders of the Myrmidons under Patroclus. || 
|}

360101–360200 

|-bgcolor=#f2f2f2
| colspan=4 align=center | 
|}

360201–360300 

|-bgcolor=#f2f2f2
| colspan=4 align=center | 
|}

360301–360400 

|-bgcolor=#f2f2f2
| colspan=4 align=center | 
|}

360401–360500 

|-bgcolor=#f2f2f2
| colspan=4 align=center | 
|}

360501–360600 

|-bgcolor=#f2f2f2
| colspan=4 align=center | 
|}

360601–360700 

|-bgcolor=#f2f2f2
| colspan=4 align=center | 
|}

360701–360800 

|-id=762
| 360762 FRIPON || 2005 AT || FRIPON, the Fireball Recovery and Inter Planetary Observation Network which tries to track all the meteorites that fall in France Src || 
|}

360801–360900 

|-bgcolor=#f2f2f2
| colspan=4 align=center | 
|}

360901–361000 

|-bgcolor=#f2f2f2
| colspan=4 align=center | 
|}

References 

360001-361000